"I Wanna Have Some Fun" is a pop–dance song performed by British singer Samantha Fox. It was written and produced by Full Force and was released in the last quarter of 1988 as the first American single from Fox' third album, I Wanna Have Some Fun (1988). In the US, the single was certified gold. In Europe and Australia, it was released as the album's third and final single in 1989.

The song samples Loleatta Holloway's song "Love Sensation" and Yazoo's "Situation". American drag queen, Pandora Boxx, released a cover of the song in 2012 featuring Tim Permanent.

Critical reception
In an ironic review of 10 June 1989 the Betty Page, observer of British music newspaper Record Mirror, came to the conclusion that the pop-up gatefold sleeve of the single that she got was much more interesting than the music of the disc itself.

Formats and track listings
 7" single
"I Wanna Have Some Fun" (7" Version) – 4:08
"Out of Our Hands" – 3:05

 UK / EU 12" single
"I Wanna Have Some Fun" (Extended Version) – 5:08
"Lovin' Don't Grow on Trees" – 4:11
"I Wanna Have Some Fun" (Have Some Fun Mix) – 6:08
"Out of Our Hands" – 3:05

 US 12" single
"I Wanna Have Some Fun" (Extended Version) – 5:08
"I Wanna Have Some Fun" (UK Single Edit) – 4:08
"I Wanna Have Some Fun" (Full Force Single Edit) – 4:37
"I Wanna Have Some Fun" (Have Some Fun Mix) – 6:08
"I Wanna Have Some Fun" (Album Version) – 5:03
"Don't Cheat on Me" – 3:04

Charts

Weekly charts

Yead-end charts

Certifications

References

1989 singles
Samantha Fox songs
1988 songs
Jive Records singles